Ernest Ensor (17 December 1870 – 13 August 1929) was an English-born Irish cricketer.

A right-handed batsman and right-arm fast-medium bowler, he played just once for the Ireland cricket team, against I Zingari in August 1896. In 1895, he played four first-class matches for Dublin University, taking 23 wickets at an average of 20.34.

References

1870 births
1929 deaths
Irish cricketers
Dublin University cricketers